Nanocnide is a genus of flowering plants belonging to the family Urticaceae.

Its native range is Central and Southern China to Vietnam, Temperate Eastern Asia.

Species:

Nanocnide japonica 
Nanocnide lobata 
Nanocnide zhejiangensis

References

Urticaceae
Urticaceae genera